The Wych Elm cultivar Ulmus glabra 'Spectabilis' appeared circa 1915 at the Pallesens Nursery, Kølding, Denmark.

Description
The tree was selected for its extremely rapid growth in its early years.

Cultivation
No specimens are known to survive.

References

Wych elm cultivar
Ulmus articles missing images
Ulmus
Missing elm cultivars